The Royal Australasian College of Physicians (RACP) is a not-for-profit professional organisation responsible for training and educating physicians and paediatricians across Australia and New Zealand.

The RACP is responsible for training both generalist and subspecialist physicians and paediatricians. The College has formal training programmes in general and acute medicine, paediatrics & child health, addiction medicine, adolescent medicine, cardiology, clinical genetics, dermatology (New Zealand only), clinical haematology, immunology and allergy, clinical pharmacology, community child health, endocrinology, gastroenterology, geriatric medicine, infectious diseases, neonatology, nephrology, neurology, nuclear medicine, oncology, respiratory and sleep medicine, public health medicine, occupational and environmental medicine, palliative medicine, rehabilitation, rheumatology, and sexual health medicine. The RACP is also responsible for the ongoing education of Fellows of the College through its continuing professional development (CPD) programme.

History
Until the 1930s, Australian and New Zealand Physicians had to seek membership of one of the United Kingdom Colleges in London, Glasgow, Ireland or Edinburgh.

In November 1930, a group of physicians met in Melbourne to establish the Association of Physicians of Australasia "for friendship and scientific stimulus", which solely consisted of its members; no building or permanent base existed.

In 1934, the Association of Physicians of Australasia Council decided that an examining and executive body College should be formed to enhance the prestige of the profession, stimulate interest in medical education and research, and set a standard of professional ethical conduct. The constitution was to be modelled on that of the London College.

In 1937, the Association purchased premises at 145 Macquarie Street, Sydney, which had originally been the home of the Fairfax family. Funds were raised by the NSW Government and public donation.

In 1938, the College was incorporated and the first meeting of the Council was held in April.

The motto of "hominum servire saluti" ("to serve the health of our people") was adopted for the College coat of arms.

In September that year 47 candidates took the first examinations and 41 members were admitted.

Structure
The RACP is divided into two Divisions and three Faculties. Each Division has a number of Chapters.

Divisions
 Adult Medicine Division
 Paediatrics & Child Health Division

Faculties
 Australasian Faculty of Public Health Medicine
 Australasian Faculty of Rehabilitation Medicine
 Australasian Faculty of Occupational and Environmental Medicine

Chapters
 Chapter of Community Child Health
 Australasian Chapter of Palliative Medicine
 Australasian Chapter of Addiction Medicine
 Australasian Chapter of Sexual Health Medicine (formerly Australasian College of Sexual Health Physicians)

Speciality societies
The RACP is affiliated with 51 independent Speciality Societies. These are independent membership organisations for individuals who practice in a specific medical subspeciality. The RACP consults closely with these societies when designing its curricula. The RACP provided a pathway for intensive care medicine specialty training in Australia and New Zealand until an independent intensive care medicine college was launched in 2008.

Facilities
The History of Medicine Library at the RACP has a leading collection of medical history items from Australia and around the world. The RACP established the History of Medicine Library in 1938 as a clinical library. The focus of the library changed to medical history in the mid 1950s. The History of Medicine Library continues to grow through the contributions of College Members.

Publications 
The RACP also publishes two medical journals, The Internal Medicine Journal and The Journal of Paediatrics and Child Health, and has a foundation which provides funding for research in the field of internal medicine.

The RACP issued a position statement on non-therapeutic circumcision of boys in 2010.

Qualifications

Fellow

The qualification of "Fellow of the Royal Australasian College of Physicians", abbreviated as the post-nominal initials FRACP, is a recognition of the completion of the prescribed postgraduate specialist training programme in internal adult or internal paediatric medicine of the Royal Australasian College of Physicians.

Arms

References

External links
  – Royal Australasian College of Physicians

1938 establishments in Australia
Learned societies of Australia
Learned societies of New Zealand
Medical associations based in Australia
Medical associations based in New Zealand
Medical education in Australia
Organisations based in Australia with royal patronage
Organisations based in New Zealand with royal patronage
Australian Physicians
Specialist medical colleges in Australia